Anokhi Raat is a 1968 Hindi film produced by L. B. Lachman and L. B. Thakur and directed by Asit Sen. The film stars Sanjeev Kumar, Zaheeda Hussain, Aruna Irani, Keshto Mukherjee and Parikshit Sahni. It has music by Roshan. The film has some outstanding songs that include "Oh Re Taal Mile", "Mahalon Ka Raja Mila", "Mile Na Phool To", and "Dulhan Se Tumhara Milan Hoga".

Plot
The events depicted in the film take place on a single night and results in several characters sharing their life stories. It is a fascinating depiction of some of the challenges faced by the poor and by women in Indian society, some of which continue to this day.

Cast 
 Sanjeev Kumar as Baldev Singh
 Zaheeda Hussain as Rama / Gopa
 Tarun Bose as Madan Lal
 Aruna Irani as Mrs. Prema Rai
 Parikshit Sahni as Painter
 Anwar Hussain as Ram Das

Parikshit Sahni incidentally changed his screen name to Ajay Sahni at the suggestion of Sanjeev Kumar during the shooting of this film, before eventually reverting to his own name a few years later.

Soundtrack 
Music composed by Roshan.

Awards
Filmfare Best Art Direction (black & white)- Ajit Bannerjee
Filmfare Best Cinematographer Award (black & white) -  Kamal Bose
Filmfare Best Screenplay Award- Hrishikesh Mukherjee
Filmfare Best Dialogue Award-  Anand Kumar

References

External links

 

1968 films
1960s Hindi-language films
Indian black-and-white films
Films scored by Roshan
Films whose writer won the Best Original Screenplay National Film Award